Department of the Special Minister of State may refer to:

 Department of the Special Minister of State (1972–75), an Australian government department
 Department of the Special Minister of State (1983–87), an Australian government department